Boggsville is a former settlement in Bent County, Colorado, USA near the Purgatoire River about  above the Purgatoire's confluence with the Arkansas River. It was established in 1866. The surviving structures are among the earliest examples of Territorial architecture in Colorado. Boggsville was the last home of frontiersman Kit Carson before his death in 1868 at Fort Lyon.  The U.S. Post Office at Las Animas (ZIP Code 81054) now serves Boggsville postal addresses.

Boggville lies along Highway 101 about 2 miles south of Las Animas.

History
The village was a stagecoach station on the Purgatory Branch of the Santa Fe Trail. With the establishment of Bent County in 1870, Boggsville became the county seat. The town was named for Thomas O. Boggs (b. 1824, an Indian trader from the Indian Territory and cattle dealer. In 1846 Boggs married 14-year-old Rumalda Luna Bent, the stepdaughter of Charles Bent, first American governor of New Mexico, who was an heiress to land grants in Colorado. In 1866 Boggs built an adobe house on the  grant. The next year John Wesley Prowers built a two-story 14-room house at Boggsville that functioned as a house, a school, a stagecoach station, and after 1870 as the Bent County seat.

The ditch was the first such irrigation project in southeastern Colorado.

In 1873 the county seat was relocated to Las Animas City. At that time Boggsville had 97 voting citizens. The same year, the town was bypassed by the Atchison, Topeka and Santa Fe Railway and the Kansas Pacific Railroad. Prowers moved to West Las Animas and became a cattle rancher and politician. Boggs, who was the first sheriff of Bent County and who was elected to the territorial legislature in 1871, moved to Springer, New Mexico in 1877 after his wife's land grants were contested. After the departure of Prowers and Boggs the property was sold, becoming the San Patricio Ranch of  under the Lee family.

Description

There had been at one time thirteen permanent buildings in the village, one of which was the home of Kit Carson from December 1867 until Carson's death in May 1868. The Carson House was destroyed in a 1921 flood.

The Boggs House has been unoccupied since 1975. It is U-shaped but was originally L-shaped. The one-story adobe structure combines features of Territorial architecture and Greek Revival characteristics. The Prowers House was last inhabited in the 1950s The rectangular house was partly collapsed by the 1980s, with portions removed as early as the 1920s. The Powers House is adobe, with interior woodwork brought to the site from St. Louis. There are a further five outbuildings associated with the Boggs House.

The Boggs and Prowers houses have been restored by the Pioneer Historical Society of Bent County, and the site is open to the public. Boggsville was placed on the National Register of Historic Places on October 24, 1986.

Notable person
 Amache Prowers, Native American activist, cattle rancher, advocate, and storeowner.

See also
 List of cities and towns in Colorado

References

External links
 Boggsville Historic Site at the Pioneer Historical Society of Bent County
 Explore Southeast Colorado: Boggsville Historic Site

Unincorporated communities in Bent County, Colorado
Unincorporated communities in Colorado
Museums in Bent County, Colorado
Historic districts on the National Register of Historic Places in Colorado
1866 establishments in Colorado Territory
National Register of Historic Places in Bent County, Colorado
Former county seats in Colorado